Nonda is a rural town in the locality of Maxwelton in the Shire of Richmond, Queensland, Australia.

Geography 
Nonda railway station is on the Great Northern Railway from Townsville to Mount Isa.

History 
The town of Nonda appears on a 1907 survey plan. The name Nonda is an Aboriginal word meaning the "plum" tree, Parinari nonda.

Nonda State School opened on 14 April 1925 and closed on 25 July 1975. It was in Corella Street.

References

External links 
 

Towns in Queensland
Shire of Richmond